The Catholic Church in Laos is part of the worldwide Catholic Church, under the spiritual leadership of the pope in Rome. The Catholic Church is officially recognized by the Lao Front for National Construction.

Hierarchy 
There are no dioceses in the country. Rather, Laos is divided into four Apostolic Vicariates, which are pre-diocesan jurisdictions that are entitled to a titular bishop and are exempt, i.e., directly subject to the Holy See and its missionary Congregation for the Evangelization of Peoples. The four vicariates are:

 Vicariate Apostolic of Luang Prabang
 Vicariate Apostolic of Paksé
 Vicariate Apostolic of Savannakhet
 Vicariate Apostolic of Vientiane

Each vicariate is headed by an apostolic vicar, who thereby is a member of the common episcopal conference of Laos and (Indochinese neighbour) Cambodia.

The Holy See has an Apostolic Delegation (papal diplomatic legation of lower rank than an embassy) to Laos. The delegation, however, is based in Bangkok, the capital of neighbouring Thailand. The papal legation to Laos is vested in the Apostolic nuncio to Thailand (as are also the papal legations to Cambodia and Myanmar).

History 
On 4 May 1899, the Apostolic Vicariate of Laos was established on territory split off from the Apostolic Vicariate of Eastern Siam; it would be renamed on 21 December 1950 as Apostolic Vicariate of Thare, after its new see in Thailand, to become the present (Thai)  Metropolitan Archdiocese of Thare and Nonseng.

The Apostolic Vicariate of Laos lost territories in two splits :
 on 14 June 1938 the Apostolic Prefecture of Vientiane and Luang-Prabang was split off, which on 13 March 1952 was promoted as Apostolic Vicariate of Vientiane  
 on 21 December Apostolic Prefecture of Thakhek was split off, which on 24 February 1958 was promoted as Apostolic Vicariate of Thakhek, which on 26 November 1963 was renamed as Apostolic Vicariate of Savannakhet

On 1 March 1963, the Apostolic Vicariate of Luang Prabang was in turn split off from the Apostolic Vicariate of Vientiane.

On 12 June 1967, the Apostolic Vicariate of Pakse was split off from the Apostolic Vicariate of Savannakhet).

Description 

There are roughly 50,000 to 60,000 Laotian Catholics in 2015, rise from 45,000 people in 2007. Many of whom are ethnic Vietnamese, concentrated in major urban centers and surrounding areas along the Mekong River in the central and southern regions of the country. The Catholic Church has an established presence in five of the most populous central and southern provinces, and Catholics are able to worship openly.

The Catholic Church's activities are more circumscribed in the north. There are four bishops, two located in Vientiane and others located in the cities of Thakhek and Pakse. One of the two bishops resident in Vientiane oversees the Vientiane Diocese and is responsible for the central part of the country. The second bishop resident in Vientiane is the Bishop of Luang Prabang. He is assigned to the northern part of the country, but while the Government did not permit him to take up his post, it did permit him to travel to visit church congregations in the north.

Relationship between the Church and government has been strained since 1950s, a time when the Church was openly opposed to Pathet Lao. The relationship after 1975 is categorised as mutually suspicious within each other. The church's property in Luang Prabang was seized after the 1975 Communist takeover, and there is no longer a parsonage in that city. An informal Catholic training center in Thakhek prepared a small number of priests to serve the Catholic community. Several foreign nuns temporarily serve in the Vientiane diocese.

See also 
 List of Saints from Asia

References

Bibliography

External links and sources 
 GCatholic (and further links)